Krisztina Hohn (born in Komló, Hungary on June 16, 1972) is a Hungarian politician of the New Start (Hungary). She has served as the Mayor of Mánfa from 2006 to 2018. She currently serves as a member of parliament in the National Assembly of Hungary since 2018. She serves as the Vice-Chairman of the Parliamentary Committee on Budgets. In the 2018 parliamentary elections in Hungary, he represented the 2nd OEVK of Baranya County. Krisztina replaced György Gémesi.

References 

Living people
People from Komló
1972 births
21st-century Hungarian women politicians
21st-century Hungarian politicians
New Start (Hungary) politicians
Members of the National Assembly of Hungary (2018–2022)
Women members of the National Assembly of Hungary